The gallon is a unit of volume in imperial units and United States customary units. Three different versions are in current use: 
the US dry gallon ("usdrygal"), defined as  US bushel (exactly ).

There are two pints in a quart and four quarts in a gallon. Different sizes of pints account for the different sizes of the imperial and US gallons.

The IEEE standard symbol for both US (liquid) and imperial gallon is gal, not to be confused with the gal (symbol: Gal), a CGS unit of acceleration.

Definitions
The gallon currently has one definition in the imperial system, and two definitions (liquid and dry) in the US customary system. Historically, there were many definitions and redefinitions.

English system gallons
There were a number of systems of liquid measurements in the United Kingdom prior to the 19th century.
Henry VII (Winchester) corn gallon from 1497 onwards was 
Elizabeth I corn gallon from 1601 onwards was 
William III corn gallon from 1697 onwards was 
London 'Guildhall' gallon (before 1688) was 
Jersey gallon (from 1562 onwards) was 
Guernsey gallon (17th century origins till 1917) was 

Imperial gallon

The British imperial gallon (frequently called simply "gallon") is defined as exactly 4.54609 dm3. There are four quarts in a gallon, two imperial pints in a quart, and there are 20 imperial fluid ounces in an imperial pint, yielding 160 fluid ounces in an imperial gallon.

US liquid gallon

The US liquid gallon (frequently called simply "gallon") is legally defined as 231 cubic inches, which is exactly . In order to overcome the effects of expansion and contraction with temperature when using a gallon to specify a quantity of material for purposes of trade, it is common to define the temperature at which the material will occupy the specified volume.

US dry gallon

The US dry gallon is not used in commerce, and is also not listed in the relevant statute, which jumps from the dry pint to the bushel.

Worldwide usage

Imperial gallon
As of 2021, the imperial gallon continues to be used as the standard petrol unit in four British Overseas Territories (Anguilla, the British Virgin Islands, the Cayman Islands, and Montserrat) and six countries (Antigua and Barbuda, Dominica, Grenada, Saint Christopher and Nevis, Saint Lucia, and Saint Vincent and the Grenadines).

All of the countries and territories which use the imperial gallon as their petrol unit also use miles per hour for speed limits, and drive on the left side of the road.

The United Arab Emirates ceased selling petrol by the imperial gallon in 2010 and switched to the litre, with Guyana following suit in 2013.

Burma subsequently switched from the imperial gallon to the litre in 2014.

Antigua and Barbuda has proposed switching to selling petrol by litres since 2015.

The gallon was removed from the list of legally defined primary units of measure catalogued in the EU directive 80/181/EEC for trading and official purposes, with effect from 31 December 1994. Under the directive the gallon could still be used, but only as a supplementary or secondary unit. One of the effects of this directive was that the United Kingdom amended its own legislation to replace the gallon with the litre as a primary unit of measure in trade and in the conduct of public business, effective from 30 September 1995. However within the United Kingdom and Ireland, barrels and large containers of beer, oil and other fluids are commonly in multiples of an imperial gallon. 

Ireland also passed legislation in response to the EU directive, with the effective date being 31 December 1993. Though the gallon has ceased to be a primary unit of trade, it can still be legally used in both the UK and Ireland as a supplementary unit.

Miles per imperial gallon is used as the primary fuel economy unit in the United Kingdom and as a supplementary unit in Canada on official documentation.

US liquid gallon 
Other than the United States, petrol is sold by the US gallon in Belize, Colombia, Dominican Republic, Ecuador, Guatemala, Haiti, Honduras, Nicaragua, and Peru, as well as in the Marshall Islands, Federated States of Micronesia, and Palau, which are associated with the United States, and Liberia, a former protectorate of the United States.

Despite its status as a US territory, and unlike American Samoa, the Northern Mariana Islands, Guam, and the US Virgin Islands, Puerto Rico ceased selling petrol by the US gallon in 1980.

Panama ceased selling petrol in US gallons in 2013 and now uses litres, while El Salvador followed suit in June 2021.

In the Turks and Caicos Islands, both the US gallon and imperial gallon are used due to an increase in tax duties which was disguised by levying the same duty on the US gallon (3.79 L) as was previously levied on the Imperial gallon (4.55 L).

The Bahamas also uses both the US gallon and imperial gallon.

Water chiller bottles in some parts of the Middle East (such as United Arab Emirates and Bahrain) are 19 L in volume, which approximates to 5 US gallons.

Relationship to other units
Both the US liquid and imperial gallon are divided into four quarts (quarter gallons), which in turn are divided into two pints, which in turn are divided into two cups, (not in customary use outside the US), which in turn are further divided into two gills. Thus, both gallons are equal to four quarts, eight pints, sixteen cups, or thirty-two gills.

Thus, the imperial gallon, quart, pint, cup and gill are approximately 20% larger than their US counterparts, meaning these are not interchangeable, but the imperial fluid ounce is only approximately 4% smaller than the US fluid ounce, meaning these are often used interchangeably.

Historically, a common bottle size for liquor in the US was the "fifth", i.e. one-fifth of a US gallon (or one-sixth of an imperial gallon). While spirit sales in the US were switched to metric measures in 1976, a 750 mL bottle is still sometimes known as a "fifth".

History

This suggests a common origin in Romance Latin, but the ultimate source of the word is unknown.

The gallon originated as the base of systems for measuring wine and beer in England. The sizes of gallon used in these two systems were different from each other: the first was based on the wine gallon (equal in size to the US gallon), and the second one either the ale gallon or the larger imperial gallon.

By the end of the 18th century, there were three definitions of the gallon in common use:

The corn or dry gallon is used (along with the dry quart and pint) in the United States for grain and other dry commodities. It is one-eighth of the (Winchester) bushel, originally defined as a cylindrical measure of  inches in diameter and 8 inches in depth, which made the dry gallon )2 ×  ≈ 2150.42017 cubic inches. The bushel was later defined to be 2150.42 cubic inches exactly, thus making its gallon exactly ; in previous centuries, there had been a corn gallon of between 271 and 272 cubic inches.

The wine, fluid, or liquid gallon has been the standard US gallon since the early 19th century. The wine gallon, which some sources relate to the volume occupied by eight medieval merchant pounds of wine, was at one time defined as the volume of a cylinder 6 inches deep and 7 inches in diameter, i.e. .

 

Although the wine gallon had been used for centuries for import duty purposes, there was no legal standard of it in the Exchequer, while a smaller gallon  was actually in use, requiring this statute; the 231 cubic inch gallon remains the U.S. definition today.

In 1824, Britain adopted a close approximation to the ale gallon known as the imperial gallon, and abolished all other gallons in favour of it.

The precise definition of exactly  cubic decimetres (also , ≈ ) came after the litre was redefined in 1964. This was adopted shortly afterwards in Canada, and adopted in 1976 in the United Kingdom.

Sizes of gallons
Historically, gallons of various sizes were used in many parts of Western Europe. In these localities, it has been replaced as the unit of capacity by the litre.

References

External links

Customary units of measurement in the United States
Imperial units
Systems of units
Units of volume
Alcohol measurement
Cooking weights and measures